Events in the year 1695 in Norway.

Incumbents
Monarch: Christian V

Events
 Johanne Nielsdatter, was executed for witchcraft. Her execution is the last confirmed execution for witchcraft in Norway.

Arts and literature

Births

Deaths
March – Edvard Edvardsen, educator and historian (born 1630).
Johanne Nielsdatter, executed for witchcraft.

See also

References